In algebraic geometry, Reider's theorem gives conditions for a line bundle on a projective surface to be very ample.

Statement
Let D be a nef divisor on a smooth projective surface X. Denote by KX the canonical divisor of X.
 If D2 > 4, then the linear system |KX+D| has no base points unless there exists a nonzero effective divisor E such that
 , or
 ;
 If D2 > 8, then the linear system |KX+D| is very ample unless there exists a nonzero effective divisor E satisfying one of the following:
 ;

Applications
Reider's theorem implies the surface case of the Fujita conjecture. Let L be an ample line bundle on a smooth projective surface X. If m > 2, then for D=mL we have 
 D2 = m2 L2 ≥ m2 > 4;
 for any effective divisor E the ampleness of L implies D · E = m(L · E) ≥ m > 2.
Thus by the first part of Reider's theorem |KX+mL| is base-point-free. Similarly, for any m > 3 the linear system |KX+mL| is very ample.

References

Algebraic surfaces
Theorems in algebraic geometry